Naxi may refer to:

 Naxi people, an ethnic group mainly living in southwest provinces of China
 Naxi language (納西語), the language of the Naxi people
 Naxi District, Luzhou, Sichuan